JWL may refer to:
 Jewell railway station, in Victoria, Australia
 JWL equation of state, Jones-Wilkins-Lee equation of state for explosives
 JWL standard (Japan Light Alloy Wheel standard), a set of requirements for alloy wheels set by the Ministry of Land, Infrastructure, Transport and Tourism (Japan) that must be met for all passenger cars in Japan